The Cirque Olympique in Paris, also known as the Cirque Franconi, was an equestrian theatre company, founded in 1782 by Philip Astley, the English inventor of the modern circus ring, and was initially known as the Cirque d'Astley or the Cirque Anglais.

Amphithéâtre Anglais

Astley's theatre, the Amphithéâtre Anglais or Amphithéâtre d'Astley, was the first purpose-built circus building in France. It was located on a large site in the rue du Faubourg du Temple and was a round theatre constructed in wood, with two seating levels and lit by 2,000 candles. The theatre was open four months out of the year and featured equestrian performances interspersed with juggling and other acts.

Cirque Franconi
Astley leased his Parisian circus to Antonio Franconi in 1793, during the French Revolution. Because of the small size of Astley's theatre, Franconi moved the circus to the enclosure of the former Convent of the Capucines, where he constructed stables and a new theatre.

Cirque Olympique
In 1807 Franconi ceded his enterprise to his two sons, Laurent and Henri, who renamed it the Cirque Olympique. With the construction of the rue Napoléon that same year, they were obliged to move again, to a new theatre between the rue du Mont-Thabor and the rue Saint-Honoré. It was leased to them by Francois Delpont and opened on 28 December 1807. The Franconi brothers were forced to close this theatre on 27 May 1816, due to the planned construction of the public treasury at this location.

Return to Astley's theatre
The two brothers decided to return to Astley's old theatre on the rue du Faubourg du Temple, making extensive additions and alterations to the theatre and its site and renaming it the Cirque Olympique. They inaugurated the new theatre on 8 February 1817. On the night of 15 March 1826, after a performance of the one-act melodrama L'incendie de Salins, featuring a grand spectacle recreating the dramatic fire at Salins-les-Bains of 27 July 1825, the pyrotechnical effects sparked a genuine fire that burned the theatre to the ground.

Cirque Olympique on the Boulevard du Temple

After the fire which destroyed the Cirque Olympique on the rue Faubourg du Temple, 
the brothers Franconi moved again, this time to the boulevard du Temple, where they built yet another theatre, also known as the Cirque Olympique. The new theatre, built to the designs of the French architect Alexandre Bourla, was inaugurated on 21 March 1827. It was remodeled in 1847 by the architect  for the use of the Opéra-National, which occupied it from 18 June 1844 to 1847. Thereafter it was known as the Théâtre National until 4 July 1853, when it became the Théâtre du Cirque Impérial. The theatre was demolished in 1862 for an urban renewal project, and the director at that time, Hippolyte Hostein, moved the circus to the Théâtre du Châtelet.

References
Notes

Sources
Almanach du voyageur à Paris et dans les lieux les plus remarquables du royaume. Paris: Hardouin, 1787. Pg 219. Early description of the theatre- available online at the BNF
Architectonographie des théâtres de Paris, ou Parallèle historique et critique de ces édifices considérés sous le rapport de l'architecture et de la décoration. Paris : impr. de P. Didot l'aîné: Orgiazzi, 1821. pp 223–226. Extensive description of the theatre and later alterations- available online at the BNF
Tristan Remy. Les Clowns. Paris: Grasset, 2002. 
 Wild, Nicole (1989). Dictionnaire des théâtres parisiens au XIXe siècle: les théâtres et la musique. Paris: Aux Amateurs de livres. .  (paperback). View formats and editions at WorldCat.
Charles Hervey. The Theatres of Paris 
Galignani's New Guide of Paris

External links
Circus history timeline from Miami University

Circuses in Paris
18th century in Paris
Former buildings and structures in Paris
19th century in Paris
Theatres completed in 1782
Buildings and structures demolished in 1826
Defunct entertainment venues
Burned buildings and structures in France
Event venues established in 1782
1782 establishments in France
1826 disestablishments in France
Demolished buildings and structures in Paris
18th-century architecture in France